Edward Edwards (1816 – 16 September 1897), also known by his bardic name of "Pencerdd Ceredigion", was a Welsh musician and composer.

He was born in Aberystwyth and became a regular churchgoer at Llanbadarn Fawr, joining the choir.  When the family moved to Capel Dewi, he was appointed precentor of the local chapel.  Later he returned to Aberystwyth, where he worked as a shoemaker. He formed a successful choir at the Tabernacle chapel after returning to Aberystwyth.  He died in 1897 and was buried at Aberystwyth.

Sources
Welsh Biography Online

1816 births
1897 deaths
People from Aberystwyth
Welsh composers
Welsh male composers
19th-century British composers
19th-century British male musicians